Cláudia Sofia Gomes Monteiro de Aguiar is a Portuguese politician of the Social Democratic Party (PSD) who has been serving as a Member of the European Parliament since 2014.

Aguiar became a Member of the European Parliament in the 2014 elections. She has since been serving on the Committee on Transport and Tourism. Following the 2019 elections, she also joined the Committee on Fisheries as vice-chairwoman.

In addition to her committee assignments, Aguiar has been part of the Parliament's delegations for relations with Brazil (2014-2019), South Africa (since 2019) and the ACP–EU Joint Parliamentary Assembly (since 2021). She is also a member of the European Parliament Intergroup on Climate Change, Biodiversity and Sustainable Development, the European Parliament Intergroup on Seas, Rivers, Islands and Coastal Areas and the European Parliament Intergroup on Artificial Intelligence and Digital.

References

1982 births
Living people
Social Democratic Party (Portugal) MEPs
MEPs for Portugal 2014–2019
MEPs for Portugal 2019–2024
21st-century women MEPs for Portugal